The Clark Parade Grounds also known as the Clark Development Corporation Parade Grounds (CDC PG) is a sporting open ground at the Clark Freeport Zone in Mabalacat, Pampanga, Philippines.

History
The Clark Parade Grounds used to be the parade field of Fort Stotsenburg of the United States Cavalry. It was used by soldiers as a concert venue and a polo field.

In 2015, the Clark Development Corporation made a  renovation of the parade grounds which included improvement of the jogging path, installation of new lights and other utilities and fixtures.

Facilities
The Clark Parade Grounds is among the frequented places in the Clark area. It hosts sport tourism events and also used for leisure events such as jogging and cycling.

References

Clark Freeport Zone
Sports complexes in the Philippines
Parks in the Philippines
Buildings and structures in Mabalacat